Yushkevich,  is a common Russian language surname of Polish, Belarusian and Jewish origin. It comes from "Yushka", a variation on the name Yuriy. It may refer to:

 Adolf Yushkevich, Russian historian of science
 Dmitri Yushkevich, Russian ice hockey player
 Pavel Yushkevich, Russian philosopher, father of Adolf Yushkevich
 Semyon Yushkevich, Russian writer
Vasily Yushkevich, Soviet general

See also
 Igor Youskevitch (1912–1994), a ballet dancer, teacher and choreographer. 
 Nina Youshkevitch (1920–1998), a ballet dancer and teacher, restorer of ballets by Nijinska. 
 Juszkiewicz

Belarusian-language surnames
Russian-language surnames
Surnames of Belarusian origin